In mathematics, Hooley's delta function, also called Erdős--Hooley delta-function, is the maximum number of divisors of  in  for all , where  is the Euler's number. The first few terms of this sequence are
 .

History
The sequence was first introduced by Paul Erdős in 1974, then studied by Christopher Hooley in 1979.

In 1985, Helmut Maier and Gérald Tenenbaum proved that  for some constant  and all .

Usage 
This function measures the tendency of divisors of a number to cluster.

See also 
 Divisor function
 Euler's number

References

Divisor function
Arithmetic functions
Number theory
Integer sequences